Finglish is the Finnish language mixed with English.

Finglish may also refer to:
 American Finnish the form of Finnish in Canada and the United States.
 Fingilish, the casual romanization of Persian alphabet 
Finglish, informal Fijian English language also known as Fijian Creole
Finglish (also Fingilish, Pinglish), Persian written with English letters Romanization of Persian

See also 
Philippine English
Franglais, or Frenglish, a mixture of French and English